Anabel Drousiotou (born 16 April 1966) is a Cypriot swimmer. She competed in the women's 100 metre backstroke at the 1980 Summer Olympics.

References

1966 births
Living people
Cypriot female swimmers
Olympic swimmers of Cyprus
Swimmers at the 1980 Summer Olympics
Place of birth missing (living people)
Female backstroke swimmers